Daniel Francis Luscombe is an Australian guitarist, producer and composer. He has been a member of The Blackeyed Susans, The Drones, Dan Kelly and the Alpha Males, Stardust Five, Spencer P. Jones & the Last Gasp and Paul Kelly and the Boon Companions, as well as playing alongside Courtney Barnett, Mick Harvey, Ariel Pink, Damo Suzuki, James Chance and Marlon Williams as a touring member of their bands. He has also produced albums for artists including Ben Salter, Fraser Gorman, Jaala, Bad Dreems, Martin Frawley, Courtney Barnett and Amyl and the Sniffers. He has composed for film with credits including Jindabyne, Hounds of Love and I Am Mother (2019).

Along with Paul Kelly, Katie Brianna and the Stormwater Boys he won the 2006 ARIA Award for Best Original Soundtrack, Cast or Show Album for their soundtrack to Jindabyne. With co-composer Antony Partos he won the 2019 APRA/AGSC Screen Music Award for Best Feature Film Score for I Am Mother.

His older brother Peter Luscombe is also a musician: both were members of Paul Kelly and the Boon Companions from 2002 to 2007.

Discography

Albums

Awards and nominations

APRA Awards

The APRA Awards are presented annually from 1982 by the Australasian Performing Right Association (APRA), "honouring composers and songwriters".

! 
|-
| 2014 
| "A Moat You Can Stand In" by The Drones (Stephen Hesketh/ Fiona Kitchin/ Gareth Liddiard/ Dan Luscombe/ Mike Noga)
| Song of the Year
| 
| 
|-
| 2019
| I Am Mother (Dan Luscombe, Antony Partos)
| Feature Film Score of the Year
| 
| 
|-
|}

ARIA Music Awards

The ARIA Music Awards is an annual awards ceremony that recognises excellence, innovation, and achievement across all genres of Australian music. They commenced in 1987. 

! 
|-
| 2006
| Jindabyne
| Best Original Soundtrack, Cast or Show Album
| 
| 
|-
| 2022
| Amyl and the Sniffers & Dan Luscombe for Amyl and the Sniffers – Comfort to Me
| Producer – Best Produced Album
| 
| 
|-

Notes

References

APRA Award winners
ARIA Award winners
Australian musicians
Australian composers
Living people
Stardust Five members
1975 births